The Wicked League is a 2015 Hong Kong sitcom series produced by Hong Kong Television Network. The first episode premiered on 22 June 2015.

Cast 
 David Chiang
 Yuen Wah
 Kwok Fung
 Pai Piao
 Peter Lai
 Lee Fung
 Fung So-bor
 May Tse
 Cheng Shu-fung
 Wong Ching
 Bonnie Wong
 Crystal Leung
 Rachel Lam

Release
A 6-minute preview was released on HKTV's YouTube channel on 16 June 2015.

References

External links
 Official website

Hong Kong Television Network original programming
2015 Hong Kong television series debuts
2010s Hong Kong television series